The CEREMADE (CEntre de REcherche en MAthématiques de la DÉcision, French for Research Centre in Mathematics of Decision) is a research centre in Mathematics within Université Paris-Dauphine. It was created in 1970.

The CEREMADE is a research center where applications of mathematics to areas of scientific activity as diverse as economics, finance, image and signal processing, data analysis and classification theory, mathematical physics, mechanics, epidemiology and astronomy are studied. Its main goal is the mathematical analysis of these problems, but also the numerical approach and the support to practical implementation in interaction with industry. The applications to economics and finance are of course very important for the insertion of CEREMADE within Universite Paris-Dauphine, and the much larger diversity of applications covered is crucial in order to maintain the position of CEREMADE as a center of excellence in applied mathematics.

The center has about 60 permanent members and is structured in 3 main research axes (in alphabetical order): (1) Mathematics applied to economics and finance, (2) Nonlinear analysis, image processing and scientific computation, (3) Probability and Statistics. These research axes are strongly tied one to another and several members belong to more than one of these research groups. These axes do not at all constitute separate entities. We can give as an example the synergies between calculus of variations and mathematics applied to economics or between probability or statistics and finance. Other examples of such interactions between axes are given by the Analysis and Probability Seminar, which meets weekly or the Master 2 on both Analysis and Probability.

The first research area is the one closest to the traditional themes of Université Paris-Dauphine, that is to say, economics, mathematical finance, insurance, risk and game theory. It is through this team that a privileged relationship has grown between the CEREMADE, the Institute of Finance, the Europlace Institute of Finance, the Risk Foundation and the various professional oriented courses and research oriented courses proposed in the Master’s of Actuarial Science (supported by the Institute of Actuaries), and in the Master 2 MASEF (jointly accredited with ENSAE).

The second research area is specialized in the study of partial differential equations from a theoretical viewpoint, but also in their applications. Members of this team thus address issues appearing in different branches of mechanics (fluid mechanics, celestial mechanics, quantum mechanics), physics and chemistry (atomic and molecular physics, quantum chemistry) and optimization. Assorted tools and equations are used and studied: variational methods, methods of optimal transportation, transport equations (kinetic equations), classical methods of analysis of partial differential equations (functional analysis, asymptotic methods, a priori estimates, etc.). Some researchers in this research axis conduct research in very sophisticated image and general signal processing. This team is in charge, together with the Probability and Statistics team, of the Master 2 Analysis and Probability of Dauphine, jointly accredited with ENS Ulm, University of Versailles and INRIA.

The probability and statistics group also develops research in various directions, ranging from Bayesian statistics and MCMC methods to the study of models of Statistical Physics. Probabilistic methods are also present in some research projects in finance and insurance. This team is in charge of a Master in the context of statistical signal processing, jointly accredited with ENSAE and ENST.

External links 
 CEREMADE's  webpage.

Research institutes in France